Hornolucka Creek is a stream in the U.S. state of Mississippi. It is a tributary to Pollys Creek.

Hornolucka is a name derived from the Choctaw language or Chickasaw language.

References

Rivers of Mississippi
Rivers of Prentiss County, Mississippi
Mississippi placenames of Native American origin